The 1922–23 Chattanooga Mocs basketball team represents University of Tennessee at Chattanooga in the 1922–23 NCAA men's basketball season. They were led by player/coach Bill Redd. The team claimed an SIAA championship and was runner-up of the 1923 Southern Conference men's basketball tournament.

References

Chattanooga
Chattanooga Mocs men's basketball seasons